John Ennis  is an American actor and comedian. Ennis was a cast member on Netflix's W/ Bob & David and on HBO's Mr. Show with Bob and David. Other roles include Walk Hard: The Dewey Cox Story, Zodiac, and the revival of Twin Peaks.

Career

Ennis has played roles in Malcolm in the Middle, Tenacious D in the Pick of Destiny, and Walk Hard: The Dewey Cox Story. He played a writer for the fictitious comedy show at the center of Studio 60 on the Sunset Strip. He also played a part in the YouTube channel RocketJump's Video Game High School as Kimberly Swan's father Kenneth Swan.  In 2007, Ennis took a small part in the film Zodiac as Terry Pascoe, protégé of the handwriting expert Sherwood Morrill.

In July 2006, Ennis joined with musician and filmmaker Andrew Jon Thomson to form a cowboy harmony western comedy musical group named Saddle Pals, in the spirit of 1930s movie singing cowboy groups such as Sons of the Pioneers and contemporaries such as Riders in the Sky.

He is also an acting teacher, having taught for several years at the Lee Strasberg Theatre Institute in Los Angeles. In the fall of 2007, John Ennis became the "Z" for a series of Wheel of Fortune commercials to celebrate the 25th anniversary of the show.

As of 2015, he stars in commercials for Smith & Forge hard cider and Pur water as well as portraying Windfall Willie for the Arizona Lottery since 2017. 
He also has starred in short films created by Brandon Calvillo on Youtube. He had a small role as a slots player opposite Kyle MacLachlan in the reboot/third season of Twin Peaks.

In 2020, Ennis appeared as a guest on the Studio 60 on the Sunset Strip marathon fundraiser episode of The George Lucas Talk Show.

In 2022, Ennis played Vinnie Palmieri in an episode of Murderville, and had a guest role in Better Call Saul, a show that has also featured his daughter Jessie in a frequent recurring role.

Education

Raised in Wellesley and Needham, Massachusetts, Ennis graduated from Xaverian Brothers High School in Westwood, Massachusetts, and received a bachelor's degree from Emerson College.

References

External links

Official Saddle Pals of the Western Frontier Website

Year of birth missing (living people)
American sketch comedians
American male comedians
21st-century American comedians
American male film actors
American male television actors
Living people
Male actors from Boston
Xaverian Brothers High School alumni
Emerson College alumni